This is a list of events held and scheduled by the It's Showtime, a kickboxing and mixed martial arts organization based in Amsterdam, Netherlands. The list consists of all the official It's Showtime events. The first event, It's Showtime - It's Showtime, took place on October 24, 1999, at Kennemer Sportcenter in Haarlem, Netherlands.

List of It's Showtime events

See also
 List of It's Showtime (kickboxing) champions
 List of K-1 events

References

External links
 It's Showtime Official website

Kickboxing-related lists